Pyotr Stanislavovich Sobolevsky (22 May 1904 – 26 June 1977) was a Soviet actor. He appeared in more than 50 films between 1926 and 1973.

Biography
Sobolevsky was born on 22 May 1904 in Tomsk. He graduated from the Leningrad Institute of Theater in 1932. Pyotr Sobolevsky died on 26 June 1977 in Moscow and was buried at Vvedenskoye Cemetery.

Selected filmography
 The Devil's Wheel  (1926)
 The Overcoat (1926)
 Somebody Else's Coat (1927)
 The Club of the Big Deed (1927)
 Little Brother (1927)
 The New Babylon (1929)
 Alone (1931)
 Sniper (1931)
 To Live (1933)
 Ball and Heart (1935)
 The Sailors of Kronstadt (1936)
 Minin and Pozharsky (1939)
 Behind Enemy Lines (1941)
 Two Friends (1941)
 Moscow Skies (1944)
 Golden Path (1945)
 Admiral Nakhimov (1946)
 Maksimka (1952)
 Admiral Ushakov (1953)
 The Secret of Two Oceans (1956)
 The First Date (1960)
 Alyosha's Love (1960)
 The Duel (1961)
 Optimistic Tragedy (1963)
 Strong with Spirit (1967)
 Turn On the Polar Lights (1972)

References

External links

1904 births
1977 deaths
People from Tomsk
People from Tomsk Governorate
Soviet male film actors
Russian male film actors
Russian male silent film actors
Honored Artists of the RSFSR
Burials at Vvedenskoye Cemetery